This is a List of Old Collegians of PLC Melbourne  – known as "P.L.C Old Collegians" - of the Presbyterian Church school, Presbyterian Ladies' College, Melbourne in Burwood, Victoria, Australia.

In 2001, The Sun-Herald named Presbyterian Ladies' College, Melbourne the best girls' school in Australia based on the number of its alumni mentioned in Who's Who in Australia.

Academic

Maureen Brunt – Emeritus Professor of Economics, Monash University
Maud Martha Cameron – Headmistress of Firbank Girls' Grammar School (1911–54) and president of the Victorian Association of Headmistresses (1936–37)
Dymphna Clark (née Lodewyckx) – Language scholar and wife of historian Manning Clark
Nina Alison Crone OAM – Teacher; Former Headmistress of Melbourne Girls Grammar School; Historian; Linguist; Journalist
Mary (Isabel) Flinn – Prominent school teacher and university lecturer
Julia Teresa Flynn – Educationist; First female school inspector; Namesake of 'Julia Flynn Avenue' in Isaacs, Australian Capital Territory
Nancy Jobson – Educator; Former headmistress of Southland Girls' High School (Invercargill, New Zealand), Queen Margaret College (Wellington, New Zealand), Fairholme Presbyterian Girls' College (Toowoomba, Queensland), and Pymble Ladies' College (Pymble, New South Wales)
Dame Leonie Judith Kramer – Former Chancellor of the University of Sydney
Elizabeth Inglis Lothian – Teacher of Classics; Councillor of the Classical Association of Victoria
Isabel McBryde AO – Professor Emerita, Australian National University; School Fellow, School of Social Sciences, Faculty of Arts; Independent Researcher
Joan Montgomery AM. OBE – Educator; former principal of Clyde School, Woodend and Presbyterian Ladies' College, Melbourne
Helen Gwynneth Palmer – Educationist, Socialist and Writer
Rosemary Teele – Rhodes Scholar
Marjorie Jean Tipping MBE – Freelance Author, Art Historian, Consultant and Lecturer on Early Victorian and Tasmanian History and Oriental and Colonial Art History

Business
Fiona Balfour – Chief Information Officer of Telstra (2006–07), and Qantas Airways (2001–06)
Dur-e Najaf Dara OAM – Restaurateur; Owner and Operator of EQ Cafebar (Melbourne); Partner/Menu Design of Nudel Bar (Melbourne); Partner of the Tea Corporation; Recipient of the Centenary Medal 2003 (also attended Methodist Girls' School, Singapore)
Jane Harvey – Director of Medibank Private; Director of IOOF Holdings
Rosemary Jessamyn Howell – Proprietor, Strategic Action Pty Ltd (formerly Rosemary Howell Business Services); Director National Board of Directors, Quality in Law Inc.
Patricia Kailis AM, OBE – Governing Director and Co-Founder of the M G Kailis Group of Companies
Kerrie Kelly – Executive Director and Chief Executive Officer of the Insurance Council of Australia Limited (also attended Walford Anglican School for Girls)
Karen Mahlab – Managing Director of the Mahlab Group; Founder of Pro Bono Australia

Community
Annie Cohen – Charity worker
Gladys Maeva Cumpston – Community worker, prize winning gardener and Braille transcriber
Henrietta Jessie Shaw Daley – Community worker; Founder of the ACT branch of the National Council of Women
Dame Phyllis Frost – Welfare worker and philanthropist, known for her commitment to unpopular causes.
Jessie McLaren – Australian missionary in Korea, book collector, teacher and translator
Lady Eliza Fraser Morrison – Charity worker; Chairman of the Victorian Red Cross home hospitals committee; Assistant commissioner of the Australian Red Cross Society in England; Appointed C.B.E. and Edward K.C.M.G
Eleanor Harriett (Nell) Rivett – Missionary and principal of the Women's Christian College, Chennai, India
Philadelphia Nina Robertson – Red Cross administrator
Helen Macpherson Schutt – Philanthropist
Lady Alice Maud Sewell – First woman to win the Wyselaskie scholarship in classical and comparative philology and logic; Founder of the Lyceum Club, Melbourne; Awarded the Coronation medal
Hilda Stevenson DBE – philanthropist and community worker
Jean Marion Tom AO – Community worker; Recipient Centenary Medal 2003, ANZAC of the Year Award RSL 1999
Rita May Wilson – Community worker

Entertainment, media and the arts
Christine Dorothy Brunton – Actress
 Felicity Cockram – Executive Producer, Producer, Business and Script Consultant; former CEO Australian Film Institute

Enid Derham – Poet
Lauris Margaret Elms – Opera Singer
Louise Berta Mosson Hanson Dyer – Patron of the arts and music publisher
 Helen Mitchell – Soprano, who would be known as Dame Nellie Melba
Helen Morse – Australian actress and costume designer
 Ida Rentoul Outhwaite – Artist
Janet Gertrude (Nettie) Palmer – Writer and critic
Ada May Plante – Artist
 Ethel Florence Lindesay Richardson – Author, published as Henry Handel Richardson
Irene Frances Taylor – Journalist and feminist
Violet Helen Evangeline Teague – Artist
Tamsin West – Actress best known for her role as Linda in Round the Twist
Helen Casey – Current Slushee Queen

Medicine and science
 Lilian Helen Alexander – Pioneering medical practitioner
 Constance Ellis – First Victorian woman to become a doctor of medicine
 Ethel Godfrey – Victoria's first female dentist
 Ethel Gray – Nursing sister and army matron
Robyn Guymer – Associate Professor, Department of Ophthalmology, University of Melbourne; Head, Macular Research Unit, Centre for Eye Research Australia; Consultant, Royal Victorian Eye and Ear Hospital
Ida Gertrude Margaret Halley – Medical officer and Feminist; One of the first female medical students at the University of Melbourne
 Dr Margaret Hilda Harper – Pioneering paediatrician, daughter of former PLC principal Rev. Dr Andrew Harper
Mary Jermyn Heseltine – One of the first Australian doctors to study exfoliative cytology; Established the first gynaecological cytology unit in Australia at King George V Hospital
Kate Mackay – Physician and public servant
Dame Annie Jean Macnamara – Medical scientist
Winifred Barbara Meredith – Pioneering medical practitioner specialising in child and infant care
Joan Janet Brown Refshauge – Pioneering medical practitioner and medical administrator
Alice Ross-King – Civilian and Army nurse
Anna "Nan" Schofield – One of the first Australian Army nurses to serve in the Middle East during World War II; Author
Dr Eleanor Margrethe (Rita) Stang – Pioneering medical practitioner
Rose Ethel Janet White-Haney – Botanist

Politics, public service and the law
 Sally Capp — Lord Mayor of Melbourne
 Catherine Deakin – Sister of Alfred Deakin
 Joan Rose Dwyer OAM – Former Chairman Equal Opportunity Board (Vic); Member, Mental Health Review Tribunal (Vic)

Elizabeth Moulton Eggleston – Academic lawyer and activist
 Vida Goldstein – Suffragette and first woman to stand for election to the Federal Parliament of Australia
 Flos Greig – First woman admitted to the Victorian Bar
Rosemary Claire Hunter – Professor of Law at the University of Kent; formerly Professor of Law at Griffith University, Dean of the Faculty of Law, Director of the Socio-Legal Research Centre
Fiona Krautil – Director of the Equal Opportunity for Women in the Workplace Agency
 Eleanor May Moore – Pacifist
Alice Frances Mabel Moss – Campaigner for women's rights
Hon. Justice Marcia Ann Neave AO- Judge, Court of Appeal, Supreme Court of Victoria; Chairwoman of the Victorian Law Reform Commission
Senator Jocelyn Newman – Former Senator for Tasmania
Kelly O'Dwyer – Federal member for the seat of Higgins.
Marion Phillips – Politician, first Australian woman to win a seat in a national parliament
Kim Rubenstein – Professor and Co-Director, 50/50 by 2030 Foundation, University of Canberra
Judge Meryl Elizabeth Sexton – Judge, County Court of Victoria
Jillian Skinner – Politician, elected as a member of the New South Wales Legislative Assembly; Currently Deputy Leader of the Opposition, Shadow Minister for Health, Shadow Minister for Science and Medical Research, and Shadow Minister for Arts
Christian Brynhild Ochiltree Jollie Smith – Solicitor, second woman to be admitted as a solicitor in New South Wales, first female taxi driver in Melbourne

Religion
Margaret Ruth Redpath AO – Former Acting Precentor, St Paul's Cathedral, Melbourne, and ground-breaking surgeon.

See also
 List of schools in Victoria
 List of high schools in Victoria
List of boarding schools
Girls Sport Victoria

References

Further reading
 Fitzpatrick, K. 1975. PLC Melbourne: The First Century 1875–1975. Burwood, Presbyterian Ladies' College.
 Reid, M.O. 1960. The Ladies Came to Stay: A Study of the Education of Girls at the Presbyterian Ladies' College, Melbourne 1875–1960. Melbourne, Council of the College.

External links
Presbyterian Ladies' College Website

PLC Melbourne

PLC Melbourne
PLC Melbourne
PLC Melbourne